William Press Group was a leading British engineering business which merged with Leonard Fairclough & Son to become a FTSE 100 company, AMEC.

History
The company was founded by William Allpress in 1913 in London.

In 1954 it started to focus on developments in cathodic protection for pipelines forming Metal and Pipeline Endurance Ltd ('MAPEL').

In the 1970s it converted about 50% of the UK's houses from town gas to natural gas.  It also diversified into offshore oil and gas under the leadership of Ray Daniels.

The name of the company changed from William Press & Son to William Press Group in 1981.

It merged with Leonard Fairclough & Son in 1982 to form AMEC.

References

British companies established in 1913
British companies disestablished in 1982
Construction and civil engineering companies of the United Kingdom
1913 establishments in England
1982 disestablishments in England
Construction and civil engineering companies disestablished in the 20th century
Construction and civil engineering companies established in 1913
Natural gas industry in the United Kingdom
Technology companies established in 1913